Michael John McKean (born October 17, 1947) is an American actor, comedian, screenwriter, composer, singer, and musician known for various roles in film and television such as Lenny Kosnowski in Laverne & Shirley, David St. Hubbins in This Is Spinal Tap, and Chuck McGill on Better Call Saul.

McKean's breakout role was annoying neighbor Lenny Kosnowski on the sitcom Laverne & Shirley. He played David St. Hubbins, lead vocalist and co-lead guitarist of the fictional rock band Spinal Tap in This Is Spinal Tap and had roles in several Christopher Guest ensemble films. He co-wrote the song "A Mighty Wind" (for the Guest film A Mighty Wind), for which he won a Grammy Award, as well as "A Kiss at the End of the Rainbow" from the same film, which was nominated for the Academy Award for Best Original Song. McKean was a cast member on Saturday Night Live for its 19th and 20th seasons in the mid-1990s.

McKean received a Primetime Emmy Award nomination for Outstanding Guest Actor in a Drama Series in 2019 for his performance as Chuck McGill on Better Call Saul. In 2020, he appeared alongside Martin Freeman in the first season of parental comedy series Breeders. He is the current voice of Lou Pickles in Nickelodeon's Rugrats franchise.

Early life
McKean was born October 17, 1947, in New York City at Manhattan Women’s Hospital, now part of the Mt. Sinai St. Luke’s complex on Amsterdam Avenue. He is the son of Ruth Stewart McKean, a librarian, and Gilbert S. McKean, one of the founders of Decca Records, and was raised in Sea Cliff, New York, on Long Island. McKean is of Irish, English, Scottish, and some German and Dutch descent. He graduated from high school in 1965. In early 1967, he was briefly a member of the New York City "baroque pop" band The Left Banke and played on the "Ivy, Ivy" single (B-side: "And Suddenly").

Career
McKean began his career (as well as the characters of Lenny and Squiggy) in Pittsburgh while a student at Carnegie Mellon; David Lander was a fellow student at CMU. Their partnership grew after graduation as part of the comedy group The Credibility Gap with Harry Shearer in Los Angeles, but McKean's breakthrough came in 1976 when he and Lander joined the cast of Laverne & Shirley portraying Lenny and Squiggy. McKean directed one episode, and the characters became something of a phenomenon, even releasing an album as Lenny and the Squigtones in 1979, which featured a young Christopher Guest on guitar (credited as Nigel Tufnel—the name Guest would use a few years later as part of the spoof rock band Spinal Tap). "Foreign Legion of Love" was a big hit for the Squigtones, with frequent play on the Dr. Demento Show. McKean also played his character in an episode of Happy Days. After leaving Laverne & Shirley in 1982, McKean appeared in the film spoof Young Doctors in Love, then two years later as David St. Hubbins in the comedy This Is Spinal Tap with both Guest and Shearer.

McKean quickly became a recognizable name in film and television, with appearances in films such as Used Cars (1980), Clue (1985), D.A.R.Y.L. (1985), Planes, Trains and Automobiles (1987), Earth Girls Are Easy (1988), and taking a lead role in Short Circuit 2 (1988).

1990s
In 1990, McKean appeared opposite Kiefer Sutherland and Dennis Hopper in Flashback. The same year, McKean was part of an ensemble cast in the television series Grand, which aired for a short time. In 1991, McKean co-wrote (with Christopher Guest) the second episode and later directed the final episode of the mock documentary series Morton & Hayes, created by Phil Mishkin and Rob Reiner.

McKean appeared in a number of movie roles, including the film adaptation of Memoirs of an Invisible Man (1992), Coneheads (1993), Airheads (1994), and Radioland Murders (1994).

Having already appeared as a musical guest and then host of Saturday Night Live, McKean joined the cast from 1994 to 1995. At the age of 46, he was the oldest person ever to join the SNL cast at the time (later surpassed by Leslie Jones, who joined in 2014 at age 47), one of a handful of SNL cast members who weren't already hired to work behind the scenes (like SNL'''s numerous writers-turned-cast members) to appear on the show before becoming a cast member and the only one to be a musical guest and a host before becoming a cast member. During this time, he also released a video follow-up to Spinal Tap, played the villainous Mr. Dittmeyer in The Brady Bunch Movie, and played the boss Gibby in the series Dream On. After leaving Saturday Night Live, McKean spent a lot of time doing children's fare, voicing various TV shows and movies.

In 1997, he performed the lead voice role in the video game Zork Grand Inquisitor as Dalboz of Gurth and appeared in the 1999 films Teaching Mrs. Tingle and Mystery, Alaska.

McKean's television guest appearances include The Simpsons; Star Trek: Voyager; Boy Meets World; Murder, She Wrote; Murphy Brown; Lois and Clark: The New Adventures of Superman; Friends; and Caroline in the City. In 1998, he guest starred in a two-part episode of The X-Files titled "Dreamland," in which his character Morris Fletcher switched bodies with Fox Mulder. The character was a success, reappearing in 1999's "Three of a Kind," an episode which focused on the recurring characters of The Lone Gunmen. The character appeared on the short-lived spin-off series in 2001, and then returned to The X-Files in its final season for an episode called "Jump the Shark."

2000s

McKean reunited with Christopher Guest in Best in Show (2000) and appeared in Little Nicky (2000), The Guru (2002), And Starring Pancho Villa as Himself (2003), and A Mighty Wind (2003), in which The Folksmen are played by the actors who played as Spinal Tap. McKean had a regular role as the brassy, heavily made-up bandleader Adrian Van Voorhees in Martin Short's series Primetime Glick. He also had guest roles on such shows as Law & Order, Family Guy, SpongeBob SquarePants, and Harvey Birdman, Attorney at Law. He did voiceover work as Henry's cousin Louie on Oswald, which coincidentally featured the voice of David Lander as Henry. He lent his voice to an episode of Kevin Smith's Clerks: The Animated Series that never aired but was included on the VHS and DVD versions of the series.

In 2003, he guest-starred on Smallville, the Superman prequel in which his wife Annette O'Toole starred as Martha Kent. McKean played Perry White, who ultimately becomes Clark Kent's boss. He previously associated with the Superman universe in 1994 on the Lois & Clark: The New Adventures of Superman first-season episode "Vatman," in which he played Dr. Fabian Leek, a cloning expert who creates a Superman clone that belonged to corporate mogul Lex Luthor (John Shea). Also, during his short stint on Saturday Night Live, McKean played Perry White in a Superman spoof.

In 2003, he appeared in the Christopher Guest comedy A Mighty Wind. He co-wrote several songs for the film, including A Mighty Wind (with Guest and Eugene Levy), which won the Grammy for Best Song Written for a Motion Picture, Television or Other Visual Media and A Kiss at the End of the Rainbow, which was nominated for the Academy Award for Best Song.

McKean performed in the Broadway production of Hairspray in 2004. He co-starred as Hines in a revival of The Pajama Game with Harry Connick, Jr. at the American Airlines Theatre in the first half of 2006. Also in 2006, McKean reunited with most of the cast of A Mighty Wind to film the comedy For Your Consideration and appeared in the play Love Song on the stage in London. His musical interests led him to a starring role in the 2008 comedy air-drumming film Adventures of Power, in which he was reunited with Jane Lynch, his co-star from For Your Consideration, in a story intended to honor the leaders and fighters of the 99% movement.

McKean was cast in the pilot episode of a remake of the British series The Thick of It as the chief of staff. The pilot was directed by Guest. McKean starred in the 40th anniversary Broadway revival of Harold Pinter's The Homecoming, co-starring Ian McShane, Raul Esparza, Eve Best, and James Frain. The show opened on December 9, 2007. In 2009, he starred in the Chicago-based Steppenwolf Theatre Company's production of Superior Donuts by playwright Tracy Letts.

2010s

On January 20, 2010, it was announced that McKean would return in an episode of Smallville alongside his spouse Annette O'Toole.

In May 2010, McKean won the Celebrity Jeopardy! tournament by defeating Jane Curtin and Cheech Marin. The earnings were donated to the International Myeloma Foundation in honor of McKean's friend Lee Grayson, who died of myeloma in 2004. In Summer 2010, McKean took over the role of the Stage Manager in Thornton Wilder's Our Town at the Barrow Street Playhouse in New York's Greenwich Village. His run ended on August 24, 2010. In 2011, McKean appeared on an episode of Sesame Street as a rock star looking for "rocks" to be in an all ROCK-band.

In April 2012, McKean began performing on Broadway in Gore Vidal's The Best Man. On May 22, 2012, McKean was hit by a car in New York City, suffering a broken leg. On June 1, 2012, McKean was released from the hospital to begin physical rehabilitation. He appeared in the HBO comedy series Family Tree in early 2013.

In early 2014, McKean played J. Edgar Hoover in Broadway previews of Robert Schenkkan's Lyndon B. Johnson bio-play All the Way, starring Emmy winner Bryan Cranston as Lyndon B. Johnson.

In 2015, McKean began appearing as a regular cast member in the first three seasons of Breaking Bad spin-off Better Call Saul in the role of the main character's older brother Chuck McGill – a new character created for the series – also having guest appearances in the show's fourth and sixth seasons. The same year, McKean began hosting the Cooking Channel television series Food: Fact or Fiction? This lighthearted show takes a look at food urban legends and features him both as host and narrator to some segments within each episode.

In 2018, McKean played Doug Forcett in the NBC sitcom The Good Place, a former stoner from Calgary, Alberta, Canada, who had a mushroom-induced hallucination in the 1970s and correctly guessed 92% of the afterlife. While Doug Forcett is mentioned multiple times in the show, McKean only portrayed him in one episode.

McKean played Sgt. Shadwell in the 2019 television mini-series adaptation of the novel Good Omens.

Personal life
In 1970, McKean married Susan Russell. They had two children, Colin (born 1976) and Fletcher (born 1985). They divorced in 1993. He married actress and singer Annette O'Toole in 1999; she had two children, Nell and Anna, from a previous marriage. Colin McKean died in 2012.

 Characters on SNL 
Recurring characters
Anthony, the weatherman from Good Morning, BrooklynCelebrity impersonations

Filmography

Film

Television

Stage

Awards and nominations

References

External links

 
 
 
 Michael McKean – Downstage Center'' interview at American Theatre Wing.org

1947 births
20th-century American male singers
20th-century American singers
21st-century American male singers
21st-century American singers
Living people
Male actors from New York City
American comedy musicians
American male composers
20th-century American composers
21st-century American composers
American male film actors
American male musical theatre actors
American male screenwriters
American male stage actors
American people of Dutch descent
American people of English descent
American people of German descent
American people of Irish descent
American people of Scottish descent
Songwriters from New York (state)
American male television actors
American television directors
American television writers
American male voice actors
American male musicians
Carnegie Mellon University College of Fine Arts alumni
Grammy Award winners
Musicians from New York (state)
People from Sea Cliff, New York
20th-century American male actors
21st-century American male actors
20th-century American comedians
21st-century American comedians
20th-century American musicians
21st-century American musicians
American sketch comedians
American male television writers
Screenwriters from New York (state)